Thomas Francis O'Malley (March 16, 1889 – October 5, 1954) was an American railroad conductor and politician.

O'Malley was born in Duluth, Minnesota. He lived in Duluth, Minnesota with his wife and family and was a railroad conductor. He served in the Minnesota House of Representatives from 1939 until his death in 1954.

References

1889 births
1954 deaths
Politicians from Duluth, Minnesota
Conductor (rail)
Members of the Minnesota House of Representatives